The Egypt of Freedom Party  (transliterated: Hizb Masr Alhureyya) is a political party in Egypt which was founded on 18 May 2011 by Amr Hamzawy and a group of Egyptian youth after the Egyptian Revolution of 2011.

References

Political parties established in 2011
Liberal parties in Egypt
2011 establishments in Egypt
Social democratic parties in Africa
Socialist parties in Egypt